This is a list of live performances by film score composer, orchestrator, conductor and former trumpet player Ennio Morricone. He composed and arranged scores for more than 500 film and television productions.

Advised to study composition, Morricone specialized in playing trumpet in the late 40s and supported himself by playing in various jazz bands.
From 1964 up to their eventual disbandment in 1980, Ennio Morricone was the trumpet player of Gruppo di Improvvisazione Nuova Consonanza (G.I.N.C.), a group of composers who performed and recorded avant-garde free improvisations. The Rome-based avant-garde ensemble was dedicated to the development of improvisation and new music methods. The ensemble functioned as a laboratory of sorts, working with anti-musical systems and noise techniques in an attempt to redefine the new music ensemble and explore "New Consonance." Morricone played a key role in The Group and was among the core members in its revolving line-up; in addition to serving as their trumpet player, he directed them on many occasions and they can be heard on a large number of his scores from the 1970s.

Ennio Morricone has conducted many orchestras worldwide. He is serving as one of the main conductors of the Orchestra Roma Sinfonietta since the mid-90s. He has conducted over 300 concerts worldwide and is still performing regularly.

The composer performed in such prestigious venues as the Great Hall in Beijing, the General Assembly Hall of the UN in New York City, the Royal Albert Hall in London, the Kremlin in Moscow and the Arena di Verona. Morricone made his American debut in 2007 at Radio City Music Hall.

This list includes only performances by Ennio Morricone as conductor of his film music and classical works.

Performances as conductor

References

Concerts
Lists of concerts and performances